The Association Internationale des Écoles Supérieures d'Éducation Physique (AIESEP) or the International Association for Physical Education in Higher Education is the professional association for higher education physical education.

History
It was founded in Portugal on 2 August 1962 by eleven sports education institutions.

Function
It works with the International Council of Sport Science and Physical Education (ICSSPE), which has a broader remit, and the FIEP, which has a European outlook.

It deseminates best practice about physical education at the university level, internationally.

World Conventions
 1990 Loughborough University - Anne, Princess Royal opened the convention at 12.30pm on Friday 20 July; it was the first time that the annual five-day convention had been held in the UK; the theme of the convention was Moving towards Excellence, with topics on sports coaching, and around 400 delegates attending from around the world; it was partly paid for by the British Council of Physical Recreation (now called the Sport and Recreation Alliance); Princess Anne presented the AIESEP Scientific Prize, and gave a talk, attended by AIESEP leader John Cheffers, and the university's chancellor and vice-chancellor, Den Davies, and the chairman of Leicestershire County Council Princess Anne talked of morality in sport, and the wider effects of sport, and looking at the code of conduct of the British Institute of Sports Coaches (now called UK Coaching)
 2015 at the European University of Madrid (Universidad Europea, School of Sports Science) from 8–11 July
 2018 at the University of Edinburgh until 28 July

See also
 INSEP
 European Physical Education Association
 Fédération internationale d’éducation physique (FIEP), headquartered in Belgium
 World Association for Sports Management

References

External links
 AIESEP

Educational organizations established in 1962
International educational organizations
International sports organizations
Physical education associations
Sports instruction
Sports organizations established in 1962